WebAnywhere is a free web-based open source screen reader, created at the University of Washington.

Features
Since WebAnywhere is web-based, it is available on all operating systems. Users simply go to the WebAnywhere site and the screen reader begins working.

History
WebAnywhere was originally created at the University of Washington. It is currently being developed at the University of Rochester's ROCHCI Lab.

Release history

External links
 WebAnywhere (Click here to use WebAnywhere.)
 WebAnywhere main project page
 WebAnywhere source code
 University of Washington Computer Science Department
 University of Rochester's ROCHCI Lab
 Web-based program gives the blind Internet access

Screen readers